The 13305 / 06 Dhanbad - Gaya Junction Intercity Express is a Superfast express train belonging to Indian Railways East Central Railway zone that runs between  and  in India.

Coaches
The 13305 / 06 Dhanbad - Gaya Junction Intercity Express has ten general unreserved & two SLR (seating with luggage rake) coaches . It does not carry a pantry car coach.

As is customary with most train services in India, coach composition may be amended at the discretion of Indian Railways depending on demand.

Service

Routing

Traction
As the route is electrified, a  based WAP-7 electric locomotive pulls the train to its destination.

References

External links
13305 Intercity Express at India Rail Info
13306 Intercity Express at India Rail Info

Intercity Express (Indian Railways) trains
Rail transport in Jharkhand
Rail transport in Bihar
Transport in Dhanbad
Transport in Gaya, India